Gomati Sai is an Indian politician. She was elected to the Lok Sabha, lower house of the Parliament of India from Raigarh, Chhattisgarh in the 2019 Indian general election as member of the Bharatiya Janata Party.

References

External links
 Official biographical sketch in Parliament of India website

India MPs 2019–present
Lok Sabha members from Chhattisgarh
Living people
Bharatiya Janata Party politicians from Chhattisgarh
1978 births
People from Raigarh
Women in Chandigarh politics
Women members of the Lok Sabha
21st-century Indian women politicians